Keiko may refer to:

Keiko (given name), a feminine Japanese given name
Emperor Keiko
Keiko (orca), a performing killer whale best known for the film Free Willy
"Keiko" (song), a single by Lucerito dedicated to Keiko the orca
Keiko (musician), the lead vocalist of the Japanese band Globe
Keiko eiga, Japanese tendency film
Keiko O'Brien, fictional character in 1990s Star Trek TV shows The Next Generation and Deep Space Nine
Keiko (film), a 1979 Japanese film
 Keiko, a kind of Japanese armour
 Keiko Fujimori, Peruvian politician and daughter of Alberto Fujimori

See also
Kiko (disambiguation)
Quico (disambiguation)